Brian James Godawa (born November 10, 1961) is an American screenwriter and author. He wrote the screenplay for To End All Wars and The Visitation, and co-wrote Change Your Life! with Adam Christing and My Son Hunter with Phelim McAleer. 

Godawa's book, Hollywood Worldviews: Watching Films with Wisdom and Discernment, is in its ninth printing. He is also a contributor to the BioLogos Forum.

His acclaimed Biblical Fantasy books, the Nephilim Chronicles, is an imaginative retelling of Biblical stories of the Nephilim giants, the secret plans of the fallen Watchers (angel), and the War of the Seed of Serpent with the Seed of Eve. The sequel series, Chronicles of the Apocalypse,  tells the story of John the Apostle's Book of Revelation. The Chronicles of the Watchers recounts true history through the Watcher paradigm.

Early and personal life

Godawa was born on November 10, 1961, in Arlington Heights, Illinois, the son of Erwin and Lorraine Godawa, at Northwest Community Hospital, the third child of the couple (the first two being Michael and Cynthia). Godawa attended Northern Illinois University, where he received his Bachelor of Fine Arts with Honors in Illustration. He resides near Los Angeles, California with his wife Kimberly.

Other works

Chronicles of the Nephilim Book series 

 Noah Primeval (2011)
 Enoch Primordial (2012)
 Gilgamesh Immortal (2012)
 Abraham Allegiant (2013)
 Joshua Valiant (2013)
 Caleb Vigilant (2013)
 David Ascendant (2014)
 Jesus Triumphant (2015)

Chronicles of the Apocalypse Book series 
 Tyrant :Rise of the Beast  (2017) (ISBN 1942858256)
 Remnant: Rescue of the Elect (2017) (ISBN 1942858280)
 Resistant: Revolt of the Jews (2018) (ISBN 1942858353)
 Judgement: Wrath of the Lamb (2018) (ISBN 1942858426)

Chronicles of the Watchers Book series

 Jezebel: Harlot Queen of Israel (2016)
 Qin : Dragon Emperor of China (2018)
 Moses: Against the Gods of Egypt (2021)

Related books 
 The Spiritual World of Ancient China and the Bible (2019)
 The Spiritual World of Jezebel and Elijah (2019)

Watchers, The Nephilim, and the Cosmic War of the Seed 
 When Giants Were Upon the Earth (2021)
 When Watchers Ruled the Nations (2020)

Other Books

 Hollywood Worldviews: Watching Films with Wisdom and Discernment (2002)
 Word Pictures: Knowing God Through Story and Imagination (2009)
 Myth Became Fact: Storytelling, Imagination, and Apologetics in the Bible (2012)
 When Giants Were Upon the Earth: The Watchers, the Nephilim, and the Biblical Cosmic War of the Seed (2014)
 The Book of Enoch: Scripture, Heresy or What? (2016)
 God Against the Gods: Storytelling, Imagination and Apologetics in the Bible (2016)
 End Times Bible Prophecy: It’s Not What They Told You (2017)
 Israel in Bible Prophecy: The New Testament Fulfillment of the Promise to Abraham (2017)
 Psalm 82: The Divine Council of the Gods, the Judgment of the Watchers and the (2018) 
 Inheritance of the Nations (2018)
 The Spiritual World of Ancient China and the Bible: Biblical Background to the Novel Qin: Dragon Emperor of China (2019)
 The Spiritual World of Jezebel and Elijah: Biblical Background to the Novel Jezebel: Harlot Queen of Israel (2019)
 When Watchers Ruled the Nations: Pagan Gods at War with Israel’s God and the Spiritual World of the Bible (2020)

References

External links

1961 births
Living people
American Christian writers
American male screenwriters
Film theorists
American male non-fiction writers
Writers from Illinois
People from Arlington Heights, Illinois
Northern Illinois University alumni